Linden is a part of Tawa, the northernmost suburb of Wellington, New Zealand. Linden lies at the northern end of Tawa, just south of the city of Porirua.

Demographics

Linden had a population of 3,258 at the 2018 New Zealand census, an increase of 213 people (7.0%) since the 2013 census, and an increase of 444 people (15.8%) since the 2006 census. There were 1,152 households. There were 1,608 males and 1,647 females, giving a sex ratio of 0.98 males per female. The median age was 34 years (compared with 37.4 years nationally), with 681 people (20.9%) aged under 15 years, 735 (22.6%) aged 15 to 29, 1,506 (46.2%) aged 30 to 64, and 339 (10.4%) aged 65 or older.

Ethnicities were 59.3% European/Pākehā, 15.3% Māori, 12.5% Pacific peoples, 24.6% Asian, and 3.6% other ethnicities (totals add to more than 100% since people could identify with multiple ethnicities).

The proportion of people born overseas was 33.6%, compared with 27.1% nationally.

Although some people objected to giving their religion, 39.3% had no religion, 41.8% were Christian, 4.3% were Hindu, 1.6% were Muslim, 3.5% were Buddhist and 2.8% had other religions.

Of those at least 15 years old, 735 (28.5%) people had a bachelor or higher degree, and 393 (15.3%) people had no formal qualifications. The median income was $32,100, compared with $31,800 nationally. The employment status of those at least 15 was that 1,353 (52.5%) people were employed full-time, 351 (13.6%) were part-time, and 153 (5.9%) were unemployed.

Education

He Huarahi Tamariki is a teen parent unit.

Transport
Linden railway station is on the North Island Main Trunk Railway (NIMT).

References

Suburbs of Wellington City